Die Grünen (German for "the Greens") may refer to:

The Greens – The Green Alternative, the Austrian Green Party
Alliance 90/The Greens, the German Green Party
Green Party of Switzerland
Greens (South Tyrol)